Douban.com, launched on 6 March 2005, is a Chinese online database and social networking service that allows registered users to record information and create content related to film, books, music, recent events, and activities in Chinese cities. Douban is named after a Hutong in Chaoyang District, Beijing where the founder lived while he began work on the website.

Douban was formerly open to both registered and unregistered users. For registered users, the website recommends potentially interesting books, movies, and music to them in addition to serving as a social network website such as WeChat, Weibo and record keeper. For unregistered users, the website is a place to find ratings and reviews of media.

Douban has about 200 million registered users as of 2013 and some Chinese authors as well as critics register their official personal pages on the site. The platform has been compared to other review sites such as IMDb, Rotten Tomatoes and Goodreads.

Founder
Douban (Beijing Douwang Technology Co. Ltd.) was founded by Yang Bo (杨勃). He majored in physics at Tsinghua University before he attended University of California, San Diego as a PhD student. After receiving his PhD in computational physics, he worked as a research scientist at IBM. Later, he returned to China, becoming the CTO of a software company founded by one of his friends.

In 2005, Yang started to create a website for travelling named Lüzong (驴宗), initially a one-person project at a Starbucks in Beijing. In a couple of months, however, the site was transformed into what is now known as Douban.com.

Timeline

2005
March 6, account registration opened to the public
March 8, Group (小组) was released
March 9, the first topic appeared in the Group
July 6, the traditional Chinese version of the website published
August 23, Douban Location (豆瓣同城) was released to allow users to share and discover local events and activities
December 8, English version of the website opened for public testing
2013
Douban announced that Douban covered 200 million monthly independent users in the second and third quarters of 2013, double the same period last year.
As of September 2013, Douban has 16.7 million book entries, 320 million movie reviews, 1.06 million music entries, 27,000 independent musicians, and 380,000 various interest groups. 
September 17, 2013, “Douban Dongxi"（豆瓣东西）was released
Until September 2013, Douban had more than 75 million registered users, mainly from first- and second-tier cities across the country, with an average daily PV of 210 million.
2016
Until the end of 2016, Douban had 150 million registered users and 300 million monthly active users
2017
Douban launches content-paid product "Douban Time" （豆瓣时间）
2020
Beijing Douban Technology Co., Ltd., a subsidiary of Douban.com, had a significant business information change on July 8. The shareholders and business scope changed.
The company's business scope has expanded from "Internet dissemination of officially published book content" to "publishing literary original digital works, digital works consistent with the content of published publications in China," Beijing Douwang Technology Co., Ltd. 
Douban achieved the permission to publish original literary e-books.

Controversies

Censorship 
Douban has attracted a large number of intellectuals who are eager to discuss social issues. This makes Douban vulnerable to censorship by the Chinese government. Douban reviews all content posted on the website, preventing some material from being posted in the first place, and taking down other materials after the fact.

Removal of the Renaissance 
In March 2009, Douban removed art paintings of the Renaissance on the grounds that they contained 'pornographic' elements. This led to a campaign called "Portraits: Dress up" in which internet users were asked to dress up images of famous renaissance nudes in a protest against Douban's self-censorship. The administrators then removed the discussion about the campaign.

Keyword bans 
That year also saw the 20th anniversary of the 1989 Tiananmen Square protests, and Douban further extended its keyword list to ban any terms that are likely to relate to the incident. This angered some members, causing them to move to other similar websites that employ less strict self-censorship policies.

LGBT groups 
In 2011, some Chinese lesbian, gay, bisexual, and transgender (LGBT) groups announced that they had planned to boycott Douban as their posts announcing an LGBT-themed film festival had been censored by the website. In mainland China, films and television programs with LGBT themes are subject to state censorship.

The Wandering Earth ratings 
Douban has been accused that many users of Douban purposely gave The Wandering Earth, a 2019 Chinese science-fiction film, one star. Critics further accused that some users "change their given five stars to one star" and some users are paid to give one star to the film, which later turned out to be false. On 12 February 2019, Douban officially announced that "mass score-changing is abnormal and it won't be counted in the total score. To avoid such incidents, we are urgently optimizing product features." in its official Sina Weibo account.

References

External links
  
 Sample texts written on Douban, with English translation

Chinese Internet forums
Chinese entertainment websites
Chinese social networking websites
Internet properties established in 2005
Book review websites
Music review websites
Web 2.0